Giacomo Ponzetti or Giacomo Poncetti was a Roman Catholic prelate who served as Bishop of Molfetta (1518–1553).

Biography
On 12 July 1518, Giacomo Ponzetti was appointed during the papacy of Pope Leo X as Bishop of Molfetta.
He served as Bishop of Molfetta until his resignation in 1553.

Episcopal succession
While bishop, he was the principal co-consecrator of:
Pietro Ranieri, Bishop of Strongoli (1535); 
Giovanni Michele Saraceni, Archbishop of Acerenza e Matera (1536); and 
François de Mauny, Bishop of Saint-Brieuc (1545).

References

External links and additional sources
 (for Chronology of Bishops) 
 (for Chronology of Bishops) 

16th-century Italian Roman Catholic bishops
Bishops appointed by Pope Leo X
Bishops of Molfetta